Đala is a village in Serbia. It is situated in the Novi Kneževac municipality, in the North Banat District, Vojvodina province. The village has a Serb ethnic majority (80.07%) with a present Hungarian (9.86%) and Roma minority (5.57%). It has a population of 1,004 people (2002 census). At the northern exit of the village is daytime border (7 AM - 7 PM) crossing with Hungary, Đala-Tiszasziget, which can be used only by citizens of Serbia, Hungary and other EU citizens, as well as citizens of Switzerland.

History
Bronze Age graves of south Russian steppe nomads were found in the village.

Population
1961: 1,723
1971: 1,578
1981: 1,325
1991: 1,072

See also
List of places in Serbia
List of cities, towns and villages in Vojvodina

References
Slobodan Ćurčić, Broj stanovnika Vojvodine, Novi Sad, 1996.

Novi Kneževac
Populated places in Serbian Banat
Populated places in North Banat District